is a Japanese ice sledge hockey player. He was part of the Japanese sledge hockey team that won a silver medal at the 2010 Winter Paralympics.

Both of his legs were amputated below the knee following a traffic accident when he was a firefighter.

References

External links 
 

1969 births
Living people
Japanese sledge hockey players
Paralympic sledge hockey players of Japan
Paralympic silver medalists for Japan
Ice sledge hockey players at the 2010 Winter Paralympics
Para ice hockey players at the 2018 Winter Paralympics
Medalists at the 2010 Winter Paralympics
Sportspeople from Nagano Prefecture
Japanese amputees
Paralympic medalists in sledge hockey